Colonel Gordon O'Neill, was an officer in King James II's Irish army who fought at the Siege of Derry, the Battle of the Boyne, and the Battle of Aughrim for the Jacobites.

Birth and origins 
Gordon was born, about 1650 or about 1652 as the only child of Felim O'Neill of Kinard and his third wife Jean Gordon. His father was a prominent member of the O'Neill dynasty and one of the leaders of the Confederates. His mother was Scottish, a daughter of George Gordon, 1st Marquess of Huntly, and the widow of Claud Hamilton, 2nd Baron Hamilton of Strabane. His parents were both Catholic. They had married in November 1649.

Early life 
He was a young child during the Irish Confederate Wars (1641–1653). His father was executed in 1653 after the defeat.

Williamite War 
Gordon O'Neill raised a regiment for King James II in 1689 and became a colonel in the Irish army. He was the Member of Parliament for Tyrone in the brief Patriot Parliament called by James II in 1689. During the Williamite war in Ireland, he saw action in Ulster, at the Siege of Derry, the Battle of the Boyne, and the Battle of Aughrim, where he was left for dead but was picked up by some Scottish Williamite officers who recognised him.

French exile 
He recovered from his wounds, and took his regiment to France after the Treaty of Limerick in 1692. There, it was known as the Régiment de Charlemont. He died in 1705 in France.

Poem 
The 17th-century Irish poet Dermot McMurray (Irish: Diarmuid Mac Muireadhaigh) is believed to be the author of a Gaelic poem about him. The poem has a Latin endorsement that reads: Versus hibernici Gordono Ó Neill pro lingua hibernica (Irish verses to Gordon O Neill for the Irish language). The first four verses, translated into English, read:

 Go, ye handful of verses — stay not long with me — to Néill of the fine cheeks, to him everything good is due.
 Say to his soft hair, from me, that ye are a nut from the tree which I plucked — its side was towards the ground — from the branch with fresh beautiful appearance.
 Tell him, to excite mirth, Conn's and Cormac's heir, that in my store with ye there is a cofferful.
 Sir Féidhlim's son, Emhain's prince, though he speaks not Irish, shall bestow on ye a clear-bright laugh, no shame for him it is to look upon ye.

Notes and references

Notes

Citations

References 
 
 
 
  – (Preview)
  – Short biographies in the biographical notes
 
 

 

17th-century Irish people
18th-century Irish people
Irish Jacobites
Irish MPs 1689
Irish soldiers in the army of James II of England
Irish soldiers in the French Army
Members of the Parliament of Ireland (pre-1801) for County Tyrone constituencies
People from County Armagh